Malaya Marutha ( Winds from the hills) is a 1986 Kannada-language musical film starring Vishnuvardhan, Saritha and Madhavi. The film was directed and written by K. S. L. Swamy (Lalitha Ravi) and produced by C. V. L Shastry under "Shastry Movies" production house. Vijaya Bhaskar has composed the soundtrack and the background score.

In the film, a music guru is killed in a road accident and his artistic soul migrates into Vishwa (Dr. Vishnuvardhan), an aspiring musician and turns him into a virtuoso. The film also explores his relationships with two women, Girija (Madhavi), a popular dancer and Sharada (Saritha), the guru's daughter.

The film was released on 13 November 1986 to widespread critical acclaim. The film was screened at the mainstream section at the 11th International Film Festival Of India. The film won the Karnataka State Film Award for Best Male Playback Singer (K. J. Yesudas).

Plot
A revivalist melodrama in which the artistic soul of a music guru, killed in a road accident, migrates into the aspiring, but hopeless, musician Vishwa, turning him into a virtuoso capable of realising the guru's dreams. Vishwa is torn between the guru's daughter Sharada and Girija, a popular dancer whose father exploits Vishwa's talent. Vishwa embarks on building a music college with Sharada's help. Girija donates all her money to the cause, but when Vishwa loses his voice, Sharada teaches him to regain it. An interesting twist to the story is that Vishwa is the extension of Sharada's father. Though both Sharada and Girija are shown to be in love with Vishwa, he always sees Sharada in the form of Goddess and only reciprocates the love of Girija.

Cast
 Vishnuvardhan as Vishwa
Saritha as Sharada
 Madhavi as Girija 
M. S. Umesh as Violinist
Dinesh as Krishnappa - Girija's father
Shivaram as Ugranarasimhaiyya
Gode Lakshminarayan as Pashupati - Ghatam Player
Jari Venkatram
Ashwath Narayan Shastri as Venkannaiyya
Pranava Murthy
R K Surya Narayan- as Vidvan Srikanthaiyya [Introduction]
Kumari Veena Varuni-Introduction
Meese Krishna as Meese Subanna - Taxi driver
Srishailan as Television channel head
Pandit Bhimsen Joshi as himself

Production
Balu Mahendra was initially offered to direct the film but he declined the offer.

Soundtrack
Soundtrack was composed by Vijayabhaskar.

Awards
 K. J. Yesudas won Karnataka State Film Award for Best Male Playback Singer in 1986.

References

External links
 

1986 films
1980s Kannada-language films
Films scored by Vijaya Bhaskar
Indian musical drama films
Films about classical music and musicians
1980s musical drama films
Films directed by K. S. L. Swamy
1986 drama films